The 1950 Monaco Grand Prix, formally titled the Prix de Monte-Carlo et XI Grand Prix Automobile, was a Formula One motor race held on 21 May 1950 at Monaco. It was race two of seven in the 1950 World Championship of Drivers. The 100-lap race was held at an overall distance of 318.1 km (197.1 mi) and was won by Juan Manuel Fangio for the Alfa Romeo team after starting from pole position. Alberto Ascari finished second for Ferrari and Louis Chiron finished third for Maserati. It was also the first race for Ferrari in Formula One.

Report

After two qualifying sessions, on Thursday and Saturday, which Charles Pozzi, Yves Giraud-Cabantous, Pierre Levegh and Clemente Biondetti did not start, the race was dominated from start to finish by Juan Manuel Fangio, who scored his first ever victory in a World Championship event, driving an Alfa Romeo. The starting grid consisted of alternating rows of three and two, starting with three on the front row and continuing up to two on the 8th row. The first two rows of the grid (positions 1 to 5) were made up of the fastest five drivers from the Thursday qualifying session, with the remaining positions based on the other 16 drivers' times in the second session on the Saturday. This format meant that Luigi Villoresi started 6th, despite his time being fast enough for 2nd place on the grid.

Due to an accident in practice, Alfredo Piàn did not start the race, with Peter Whitehead another non-starter. The race was marred by a large pile-up during the first lap, when a wave from the harbour flooded the track at Tabac Corner. Nino Farina in 2nd, spun and crashed while Fangio managed to escape the chaos. Those who were behind them tried to stop or avoid the carnage, but eight more drivers (from a field of 19 drivers) crashed and retired. None of them was injured, but José Froilán González, who damaged his Maserati in the pile-up but was subsequently running second, crashed during the second lap. His car caught fire and he suffered burns. The race went on with many cars going off at Tabac Corner, nearly causing other accidents. Ferrari driver Luigi Villoresi charged his way from the back of the field after being delayed by the pile-up, but did not finish.

Harry Schell's Cooper was the first rear-engined car to start in a championship race. Chiron's 3rd-place finish made him the only Monegasque driver to score points in Formula One until Charles Leclerc finished 6th in the 2018 Azerbaijan Grand Prix some 68 years later.

Entries

 — Entry cancelled prior to event.

Classification

Qualifying

Positions 1-5 determined by Thursday practice. The rest of the field was set on Saturday.

Race

Notes
 – Includes 1 point for fastest lap

Championship standings after the race 
Drivers' Championship standings

 Note: Only the top five positions are listed. Only the best 4 results counted towards the Championship.

References

Monaco
Monaco Grand Prix
Grand Prix
Monaco Grand Prix